Weingartia is a genus in the family Cactaceae, with species native to Bolivia and Argentina.

Distribution 
Andes mountains of central and south Bolivia and northwest Argentina at elevations of 1600 – 3600 m.

Description 

Plants usually solitary. Stems globose to oblong, to 20 cm high and 15 cm, rarely 30 cm in diameter, fresh green. Ribs 12 – 18, spiraling, forming distinct tubercles. Areoles on the tubercle in excentric position, sunken in its higher part. Spines more robust and thick, 7 – 35 in one areole, radial spines 1 – 3 cm long, central spines 3 – 4, to 5 cm long. Flowers borne near the stem tips, one areole can produce up to 3 flowers, golden yellow to orange to reddish yellow,  1 – 3 cm in diameter. Floral tube scales broad and  imbricated. Fruits globose to ovoid, brownish. Seeds oblong,  1 mm long, black or brown.

Taxonomy
The genus Weingartia was designated in 1937 by Werdermann to replace invalid genus Spegazzinia Backeberg 1933. All  species of the genus Weingartia were transferred to synonymy status under the genus Rebutia (Hunt & Taylor, 1990; Hunt, 1999, Anderson 2001).
More recent research has indicated that the genus Rebutia as currently defined is polyphyletic. Sulcorebutia and Weingartia were kept as separate genera in the study; a summary cladogram for those species studied is shown below.

Species formerly classified as Weingartia, Sulcorebutia and Cintia Kníže & Říha show a close relationship to each other. The larger group of species of Rebutia studied, those with hairy or bristly pericarpels, form a separate, more distantly related clade (Rebutia I). It is suggested that these be excluded from the genus Rebutia.

List of species 
List of species accepted by The Plant List Org.

Weingartia fidaiana (Backeb.) Werderm.
Weingartia kargliana Rausch
Weingartia lanata F. Ritter
Weingartia neocumingii Backeb.
Weingartia neumanniana (Backeb.) Werderm.
Weingartia westii (Hutchison) Donald

First description list

References

Literature
 Augustin K.: Weingartia: history, description and reclassification. Cactus & Co. 7. (2): 91–126, 2003
 Ritter Fr.:  Kakteen in Südamerika, Spangenberg, 1980.
 Anderson E. F.: The Cactus Family, Timber Press, Portland, Oregon, 2001.

Cactoideae genera